Ranu Pelo Lottery was an Indian Bengali-language television soap opera that premiered on 3 December 2018 and aired on Bengali GEC Zee Bangla.The Show starred Bijoylakshmi Chatterjee  and model-actor Krushal Ahuja in lead roles; as well as Bhaskar Banerjee, Mimi Dutta and Swagata Mukherjee among others in prominent supporting roles. It marks the comeback of Bijoylakshmi Chatterjee into Bengali television.

Cast

Main
 Bijoylakshmi Chatterjee as Ranu Sarkar - Titular Protagonist.
 Krushal Ahuja as Dhrubo Mitra - Pijush-Basudha's youngest son.
 Arshiya Mukherjee as Lottery- Maa Laxmi in disguise.

Recurring
 Mimi Dutta as Maa Laxmi
 Payel Deb as Aishwarya "Aish" , wanted to marry Dhrubo, but had to marry his older brother. 
 Swagata Mukherjee as Basudha Mitra, who want to very rich people. And she do anything for money. She has stolen Ranu's Lottery's money. 
 Basanti Chatterjee / Chhanda Karanjee as Hiranmoyee Mitra aka "Thammi"
 Anirban Bhattacharya as Pijush Mitra - Basudha's Husband.
 Animesh Bhaduri as Shobhon Mitra - Pijush-Basudha's eldest son.
 Arindya Banerjee as Biman Mitra - Pijush-Basudha's second son.
 Riya Roy as Rimjhim Mitra - Pijush-Basudha's daughter.
 Bhaskar Banerjee as Ramlochon Sarkar - Ranu's father, gardener of the Mitra family.
 Pinky Mallick as Sarala Sarkar - Ranu's mother, domestic help of the Mitra family.
 Ananya Sen as Baby Mitra -Shobhon's wife.

See also
 Dwiragaman

References

Bengali-language television programming in India
2018 Indian television series debuts
2019 Indian television series endings
Indian drama television series
Zee Bangla original programming